Last Concert in Japan is an album by Deep Purple released in March 1977 in Japan and in 1978 in Europe. Dedicated to Tommy Bolin, it records the last Japanese concert of the Mark IV-lineup that included Bolin.
It was recorded on 15 December 1975 at the Tokyo Budokan and achieved gold certification in Japan.

Background
The performance drew 14,000 people, an attendance record for the Budokan Hall. Parts of the concert were also recorded on 16mm film and included in the video Rises Over Japan, released in Japan in 1985.

The recording was substantially edited to fit a single LP. The complete concert was remastered and restored for This Time Around: Live in Tokyo, released in 2001. In addition to including a large portion of the set omitted from the original release, the 2001 re-release restored the show's original sound quality, which was compromised when a hurriedly mastered audio track meant for a potential video release was used to hasten the original release.

The album's original cover incorrectly stated that it included a live version of "Woman from Tokyo", when it included only a short jam on its main riff, performed during Jon Lord's organ solo. This displeased Deep Purple fans, who assumed the misinformation was intended to boost sales.

In a 1995 interview, Glenn Hughes called Last Concert in Japan an "awful record". He said it "should never have been released" because "Tommy couldn't play", as Bolin had taken drugs the night before and fallen asleep on his left arm for eight hours.

Track listing

Personnel
Deep Purple
Jon Lord – keyboards, Hammond organ, backing vocals
Ian Paice – drums, percussion
David Coverdale – lead vocals
Glenn Hughes – bass, vocals
Tommy Bolin – guitar, lead vocals on "Wild Dogs"

Additional Personnel
Produced by Deep Purple and Martin Birch
Engineered by Martin Birch
Assistant engineer: Shigeo Matsumoto

Charts

Certifications

References

Albums produced by Martin Birch
1977 live albums
Deep Purple live albums
Purple Records live albums
Warner Records live albums